Neela Film Productions Private Limited is a production house based in Mumbai, India. It produces fiction and non-fiction shows for various television channels.

The company was founded in 1995, and is managed and owned by Asit Kumarr Modi. Its first production was Hum Sab Ek Hain for Sony TV, and subsequently produced shows included Yeh Duniya Hai Rangeen and Meri Biwi Wonderful for Sony TV, Pyaar Mein Twist for Star Plus, and Taarak Mehta Ka Ooltah Chashmah for SAB TV.

The company later produced the fiction drama series Saarrthi for Star Plus, Krishnaben Khakhrawala for Sony TV and Hamari Saas Leela for Colors, along with the non-fiction shows Wah! Wah! Kya Baat Hai!, an Indian comic poetry series that premiered on SAB TV, and Sab Khelo Sab Jeeto, a reality game show that also aired on SAB TV.

They currently produce the situation comedy Taarak Mehta Ka Ooltah Chashmah for SAB TV.

Neela Tele Films has been the recipient of the Indian Television Academy Awards, Indian Telly Awards, Star Guild Awards and People's Choice Awards India.

Television

Current production

Former production

References

1995 establishments in Maharashtra
Companies based in Mumbai
Mass media companies established in 1995
Television production companies of India